Folktable is a farm-to-table restaurant in Sonoma, California, United States. 

Established at the Cornerstone Sonoma marketplace in December 2020, the restaurant's executive chef is Casey Thompson and its sous chef is  Melanie Wilkerson, who previously worked with Thompson at The Inn at Rancho Santa Fe. The farmer for the restaurant is Christopher "Landy" Landercasper.

In September 2021, the restaurant was named a Michelin Guide Bib Gourmand establishment.

References

External links

Buildings and structures in Sonoma, California
Restaurants in the San Francisco Bay Area
Restaurants established in 2020
2020 establishments in California